Tallaal Adrey (born 1975) is an Australian citizen from Auburn, New South Wales sentenced to four years imprisonment in Kuwait on terrorism-related charges.

See also 
 List of Australian criminals
 List of Australians in international prisons

References 
 
 Foreign Prisoner Support Service

1975 births
Living people
People from New South Wales
People imprisoned on charges of terrorism
Australian people imprisoned abroad
Prisoners and detainees of Kuwait
Australian expatriates in Kuwait